Human Hibachi is a 2019 American found footage horror film, written and directed by Mario Cerrito. It was selected by the New Jersey Horror Con and Film Festival and Philadelphia Independent Film Festival. The movie went on to win 2021 best feature film at the New Jersey Horror Con and Film Festival.

The film was said to have been too extreme for Amazon and released to its own website on October 23, 2020. Afterwards the movie was released by Lloyd Kaufman and Michael Herz's Troma Entertainment on their streaming service Troma Now on VHX.

Plot
Chronicling a woman's 35th birthday party from start to finish, which ends in her gruesome demise, several rich cannibals frequent a Japanese owned restaurant and pay for the owner to prepare their victims for consumption.

Cast
 Wataru Nishida as Jin Yamamoto
 Andrew Hunsicker as John Mitchell
 Stafford Chavis as Bobby Shields
 Carley Harper as Meghan Cole
 Sheyla Hershey as Adriana
 Jeff Alpert as Doug Patrick
 John Campanile as Phil Maxwell
 Elizabeth Gaynor as Katie Williams

Production 
The movie was shot in the summer of 2018 in Riverside, New Jersey and Wilmington, Delaware.

Release
The film was released to Troma Now by Troma Entertainment in 2021. It was later released on a wider scale by Invincible Pictures including Amazon Prime. In August 2022 the movie was ranked #79 in the top 100 best selling horror titles on Amazon.

Reception
PopHorror.com calls Human Hibachi a "modern day tale of cannibalism and that in itself makes the film rather unique". Horror Society says, "Finally, the film doesn’t shy away from the red stuff but its use of meat is what sends it over the edge. The film has several scenes with plenty of blood but it makes use of a restaurant to work in the meat for the cannibal angle. This really make the story work while using real meat." Horror News quoted At its heart (& lungs, & stomach), it is a cannibal movie but it much deeper than that. There is a well-crafted story there that leads us into the madness and mayhem. It's a smart movie that doesn't just rely on mindless gore for cheap thrills. Nerdly.co.uk notes Human Hibachi is a brilliant play on the old “video nasty” era belief that snuff movies are real too.

References

External links

2019 films
American horror films
2019 horror films
Films shot in New Jersey
Films shot in Delaware
2010s English-language films
2010s American films